Euphorbia elegans is a species of plant in the family Euphorbiaceae.

References

External links
 Euphorbia elegans at Tropicos

elegans
Plants described in 1826